Tony E. Lombardi (born January 29, 1962) is an American football coach. He served as the interim head football coach at Eastern Michigan University for one game in 1999.

Lombardi is the father of Northern Illinois Huskies quarterback Rocky Lombardi.

Playing career
Lombardi attended Rich East High School in his hometown of Park Forest, Illinois, a southern suburb of Chicago, graduating in 1980. While in high school, he played tailback on the football team, which was coached by his father, Bob Lombardi.

Lombardi played running back for the Arizona State University Sun Devils from 1980 through 1983, and was awarded a varsity letter for all four years of play.
Lombardi went undrafted in the 1984 NFL Draft and signed as a free agent with the Chicago Bears. However, he did not make the team's roster.

Coaching career

Assistant coaching
After spending the 1985 season as defensive coordinator for his alma mater, Rich East High School in Park Forest, Illinois, Lombardi served as defensive backs coach for the Wisconsin Badgers while earning a master's degree from the University of Wisconsin–Madison. From 1989 through 1996 he was the defensive coordinator for the NCAA Division II Mankato State Mavericks (now Minnesota State University).

In 1997, then-head coach Rick Rasnick hired him as the linebackers coach for the Eastern Michigan Eagles, and in the 1998 and 1999 seasons, he served as the team's defensive coordinator.

Eastern Michigan
The first ten games of the 1999 season were coached by Rick Rasnick, with Lombardi serving as defensive coordinator. Eastern Michigan athletic director Dave Diles Jr. fired Rasnick on November 16, and named Lombardi as the interim head coach, to serve for the final game of the season. Under Rasnick, the 1999 team had compiled a record of 4 wins and 6 losses. Lombardi's one game as EMU's head coach was a 24-30 loss to the Northern Illinois on November 20, 1999 that was played in DeKalb, Illinois. With the loss on the last game of the year under Lombardi, the team concluded its season with a record of 4–7. Lombardi is the only EMU head football coach to serve for just a single game, and as a result, his five days served is the shortest tenure of any head coach in the history of Eastern Michigan football.

Jeff Woodruff hired Lombardi to coach the running backs and coordinate the special teams for the 2000 season.  Following the 2001 season Lombardi departed for the upstart professional football league the XFL.

High school

At the end of Eastern Michigan's 1999 season, none of Rasnick's assistant coaches were retained. In 2001, Lombardi was the defensive coordinator for the short-lived Chicago Enforcers of the XFL. When the XFL folded after one year, Lombardi decided to stay close to home coaching high school football in order to spend more time with his four-year-old son Rocky, saying, "Football has been so great, providing me with everything I've had in life. There's no way I was going to let Rocky grow up hating football because his dad is always gone." In 2002, Lombardi became the head coach at Homewood-Flossmoor High School in Homewood, Illinois, where his father had been coach in the late 1960s, and he quickly revitalized the struggling team. However, after just one season, Lombardi left Homewood-Flossmoor moving closer to his family who lived in Plainfield, taking over at Hinsdale Central High School in Hinsdale, Illinois, a western suburb of Chicago.

After three seasons at Hinsdale Central, in which the team posted a 30–7 record, two trips to the Class 8A quarterfinals and one trip to the semifinals, Lombardi had taken the Red Devils to the best three year record in school history.  However, in iIllinois you are not a tenured faculty member until your fourth year of employment so Lombardi was asked to resign his post as there was no need to show cause by state law.  Lombardi among great community support chose to stay and fight for his job, the community came out in large numbers with 5,000 signatures on a petition and months of supportive testimonials at every school board meeting in the end he was not retained. His lawsuit against the school district for breach of contract was settled for $10,000, and the following year the entire administrative team was fired.  Lombardi moved on to Cedar Rapids Washington High School there he took on the responsibility of Head Strength and Conditioning coach, Head Football Assistant Track and was later the Head Baseball Coach.  Lombardi made an immediate impact returning the Warriors to the playoffs in 2006.  Over the next 7 years the Warriors were either in the quarterfinals or the semi-finals of the state championships all but one season.  The track team won two state championships and never finished lower than 5th place.  In addition to that Lombardi sent over 100 athletes on to play at the collegiate level.  He built a youth program that won a National Championship and was voted the top middle school team in the nation by several youth websites in addition to that his work with youth athletics produced Nationally ranked Football, Wrestling and Baseball teams. In his free time Tony enjoys writing autobiographies on multiple web sites, including Wikipedia. In 2013 following the baseball season Lombardi resigned as Head Football and Baseball Coach and moved to West Des Moines to go into Medical Sales, following an out-of-court settlement with the Iowa Board of Educational Examiners resulting in temporary suspension of his teaching license and coaching certificate.  The youth football teams that Lombardi coached have yet to lose a lower level game at Cedar Rapids Washington.  Lombardi is currently coaching at West Des Moines Valley High School where his family resides.

His oldest son Rocky was a three-star Quarterback recruit in the Class of 2017 and would commit to Michigan State, where he was three-year letterwinner and would start 9 games for the Spartans before transferring to Northern Illinois in 2021. His younger son Beau would also be recruited to play Division 1 football as he would commit to Army, where he would switch from playing Quarterback to playing on the Offensive Line.

References

1962 births
Living people
Arizona State Sun Devils football players
Chicago Bears players
Chicago Enforcers coaches
Eastern Michigan Eagles football coaches
Minnesota State Mavericks football coaches
Wisconsin Badgers football coaches
Wisconsin–Stout Blue Devils football coaches
High school football coaches in Illinois
High school football coaches in Iowa
People from Park Forest, Illinois
Coaches of American football from Illinois
Players of American football from Illinois